This article covers the best practices and needs for reform in entrepreneurship policies in Egypt.

Startup, ease of entry

For-profit companies
Best practices
The Arab Republic of Egypt was among the top ten global Doing Business reformers in four of the seven years from 2003 to 2010. In Doing Business 2006, Egypt ranked 6th globally on reforms, and in 2007 it ranked 1st, after reforming in five out of ten areas that were studied, jumping 26 places in one year as reported in Doing Business 2008.
Egypt made starting a business easier by establishing a single access point with standardized application forms in 2004, a one stop shop.  Egypt centralized start-up paperwork in a single building, where company charters were to be submitted electronically and reapproved by the registry on the spot. Improvements continued at the General Authority for Investment and Free Zones (GAFI) one-stop shop in Cairo. The number of procedures was supposed to fall from 10 to 7. The entrepreneur can now register for taxes at the chamber of commerce directly through the one-stop shop. As a result of the reforms, the start-up time and costs were supposedly cut by more than half. Alexandria and Assiut, followed the model in Cairo, although both cities have to send a fax to the central commercial registry in Cairo to check that the company name has not been used. A computerization project is underway so that one-stop shops outside Cairo can issue the tax registration card locally.  Since the reform of the GAFI one stop shop in 2004, the total number of companies registered in Cairo more than doubled: 5,700 were registered in 2005 compared with 2,660 in 2003.  However, some observers have suggested that Egypt's one stop shop system has not reduced the number of procedures as much as initially promised. Improvements were made at the one-stop shop in Alexandria with the opening of ALEXBANK.
Egypt sharply reduced further the paid-in minimum capital requirement by more than 80%, abolishing bar association fees, and automating tax registration in 2008. Finally in the 2008 report, company start-up was eased by the removal of the minimum capital requirement entirely.
In 2006, Egypt reduced the cost of dealing with licenses and permits. Two reforms in two years significantly cut construction-related licensing costs for builders. These two reforms led to cost reductions of almost 700% of income per capita. In 2008, a new building code was introduced which aimed to further reduce the procedures and time required to deal with construction permits by establishing a single window for processing construction-related approvals and enforcing a 30-day statutory time limit. However, the municipality does not start counting the 30 days until all pre-approval procedures are completed. In 2008–09, Egypt continued to make it easier to deal with construction permits by issuing executive articles for the 2008 construction law and eliminating most pre-approvals for construction permits.
According to Doing Business 2006, Egypt made bold reforms and took a lead in streamlining customs procedures and trade documents. Egypt was the top reformer. It established a single window for trade documentation and merged 26 approvals into 5. A time limit of 2 days for clearing customs applied. Improvements were part of a broader reform that cut the number of tariff bands from 27 to 6 and simplified inspections. The inspiration was the association agreement with the European Union. New one stop shops were launched for traders at the ports, cutting the time to import by seven days and the time to export by five. According to Doing Business 2009, the port of Alexandria continued to upgrade its facilities and sped customs clearance, reducing the time to export by 1 day and the time to import by 3. GDP growth increased from 4.2% to reach 7.1% from 2003 to 2007, fueled to a large extent by the expansion in trade. Foreign investment was also up to US$11.1 billion compared with US$500 in 2003.
New listing rules for the Cairo Stock Exchange strengthened protections for minority shareholders: now an independent body must assess transactions between interested parties before they are approved. New regulations issued by the Central Bank of Egypt, gave borrowers the right to inspect their data in the private credit bureau.
Egypt promoted corporate governance by becoming the first country in the Middle East to draft a voluntary corporate governance code for companies listed on the stock exchange.

Needed Reforms
On March 29–30, 2010, Ministry of Investment reported that Small & Medium enterprises (SMEs) in Egypt account for about 75% of employment, 80% of GDP, yet contributed to only 4% of exports and 10% of fixed capital formation.

Establish one-stop shops for start up in more governorates:
The GAFI one-stop shop is a good idea but the implementation needs to be improved, according to local experts. One stop shops can show results quickly when their officials have decision-making power. Since 2003, one-stop shops cut on average 5 procedures and more than halved delays in 24 countries. However, in Egypt, gains were not as dramatic, as the number of bureaucratic steps was still quite high. 
Communicate reforms to the public:
Most reformers are bad marketers, according to Doing Business 2008. Advertising the changes can ensure that entrepreneurs know how much easier registration has become. Egypt's successful marketing campaign after tax reforms in 2005 is a good example to follow. 
Allow online start-up registration:
From single window concept, Egypt can bring it to the ultimate process which is online registration.  Online registration is one of the most effective ways to speed the start-up process. Technology can create a unified database of business information to be shared across districts, governorates and government agencies. Egypt took the first step by certifying without delay that the company name is not already in use. The next step is to allow entrepreneurs to search for the company name online. The internet can also provide them with other information such as details on procedures, fee schedules and working hours of the relevant agencies. With some simple legislation to allow electronic signatures, the internet can be used to file business registrations. Making registration electronic cuts time—by more than 50% on average. Paper registration should remain available for those without internet access.
Create one-stop shops for licenses and permits:
Governorates and other sectors of the government can follow the system in GAFI one stop shops for business start-ups. The reduction in procedures, time and cost are proof that the single window principle is effective in Egypt.
Introduce risk-based inspections:
Random inspections offer opportunities for bribes, corruption and informal payments. The authorities lose out because they cannot systematically monitor the structural soundness of their buildings and businesses lose time and money every time they have to stop construction to pay off an inspector.  Experiences from around the world show that statutory time limits are more effective when coupled with "silence is consent" rules. The latter keep bureaucrats on track and lessen the chances of lost or neglected permit applications and endless delay tactics. Countries with a system of risk-based inspections have fewer inspections than countries with random inspections. Countries with risk-based inspections do not compromise the general safety of their citizens. Instead of visiting the site at whim, inspectors stick to a schedule based on the completion of each construction phase.
Introduce online license applications and processing
In Assiut and the Ministry of Housing, Utilities and Urban Communities, the requirements to obtain a building permit are listed on their respective web sites. Other governorates can have the same system. Information about the procedures and process for obtaining a building permit helps businesses with their project planning, saving time and money. In Egypt, having forms online can save businesses at least one trip to the municipality—that can mean a whole afternoon not wasted in traffic.
Simplify and combine procedures to register property
Egypt, as reported in Doing Business 2008 report, ranked low on the ease of registering property in the world—101 out of 178 countries. In Cairo, registering property takes 193 days and costs 1.0% of property value. Each procedure can cause corruption and delays. Global data show that there is no need to have 7 separate procedures to register a property. The procedures related to obtaining the contract from the real estate registry, signing it, and picking up the new title could easily be combined. Egyptian cities can look for good practices within Egypt like in the case of Assiut where it takes 33 days only to register property; otherwise the country could look to Armenia, Croatia, Ghana and the Dominican Republic as recent examples of successful reforms. 
Keep registry records updated and continue to digitize records
Keeping records updated would cut the need for a new valuation and site inspection by the measurement department each time a property is transferred. Countries that transfer records from paper to electronic form benefit from shorter processing times. Going electronic makes it easier to identify errors and overlapping titles, improving title security. Electronic records would solve the numbering and filing problems in Assiut and provide a better organizational framework for Alexandria.

Foreign Ownership
Investment Law No. 8 of 1997 (which cancelled Law 230 of 1989) allows companies to own building lands and develop real estate as needed for implementing and expanding their activities, regardless of the nationality or place of residence of partners and shareholders or the percentage of their participation except for agricultural areas. It allows 100% foreign ownership of ventures and guarantees the right to remit income earned in Egypt and to repatriate capital.

Finances
Best practices;
Egypt was included in the list of economy where getting credits were difficult, however in 2005, Egypt expanded the scope of borrowers' information by setting up the registry defaulting on small credit card and car loans. Egypt's public registry cut the minimum loan size above which it collected data from $6,900 to $5,200. Egypt's central bank revised the banking secrecy law to allow the opening of the country's first private bureau. The credit bureau was later on outsourced to the private sector.  Access to credit information had expanded with the addition of retailers to the database of the private credit bureau in 2009. In the same year, Egyptian Financial Supervisory Authority (EFSA), a single Financial Regulatory Authority for all non-banking financial services was established.

Private Equity
Numbers of PE Funds are interested in SMEs (mostly focus on Med Cos.). Egyptian Market requirement for PE Investment estimated to be in the range of US$200 Mn – USD 500 Mn per year. These Funds would inject capital into high growth potential SMEs in the form of PE then may exit through NILEX in three to four years.

Needed reforms
The Legal & Regulatory issues with current Capital Market Law inhibited the establishment of PE Funds in Egypt (most PE Funds established offshore limiting their access to institutional investors). Improve literacy and education in managing PE Funds and develop PE Market to attract key players (angel investors, sponsored advisors).
Improving Financial Literacy to increase awareness about new financial services by educating current & potential entrepreneurs about benefits of using new viable alternatives for traditional banking services.

Business Angels
The estimated size of angel financing was approximately 1% of 2008 GDP equivalent to  annually.

Needed reforms

Encourage angel investors to play an active role in supporting early stage entrepreneurial ventures especially high growth start-ups.

Other Financial

Development of Non - Banking Financial Services (NBFI)- Reforms undertaken at Regulatory & Operational fronts to promote use of new financing alternatives best suited to SME needs focusing on SME ability to generate Cash Flow to service lease payments not on its credit history, asset or capital base (Leasing, Factoring & SME Stock Market). Leasing registry was automated to serve as Movable Collateral Registry.

Contracts/Commercial Law

Best Practices
Contract enforcement was expedited with the creation of commercial courts.(WB2010)

Bankruptcy

Egypt ranked 132nd overall in the ease of closing a business, according to Doing Business 2010.
In Egypt and Lebanon, the need for developing a framework for rescue and restructuring proceedings has been acknowledged by all parties involved in the assessment of the insolvency legislation. It has developed a mediation procedure, getting the debtor and his creditors more involved in the reorganization process through direct negotiations between them, keeping the level of involvement by courts and trustees at a minimum, and providing incentives (e.g., less penalties, easier settlement) for debtors who are aware that they can no longer pay their debts as a way of encouraging early action.  Experience has not been very satisfactory until now, because of the banks' reluctance to co-operate and provide companies with an opportunity to restructure. A serious technical impediment to the framework enabling a greater number of enterprises to restructure in a timely fashion is the bankruptcy test or "cessation of payments" which, if proved before the court, triggers bankruptcy. Most often companies end up in court for liquidation, a process which can take between 3–16 years.

Needed Reforms

There's a need to look at the Liquidation and Rescue process, assessing the effectiveness of the process and provide clarity on the various stages of the process while ensuring that an appropriate support infrastructure is in place—be it formal or informal. Time and certainty are of the essence.  Comprehensive insolvency reforms in the MENA should encompass rescue and restructuring proceedings, which are largely lacking in their current frameworks. Also, the burden of courts would be more manageable if the negotiation and settlement rights of creditors and their representatives are further developed.

Taxes
Best Practices
The new Income Tax Law No. 91 of 2005 abolished all tax exemptions stipulated in Investment Law No. 8 of 1997 and introduced a flat tax of 20% on corporate income with the exemption of companies that are prospecting for oil and gas (which will be subject to rate of 40.55%), down from 32% or 40%. Moreover, the law provides for a settlement process in tax evasion or other cases upon request from the concerned person within one year of the law's entry into force. In the same year, electronic filing and self-assessment was introduced.  Sales tax revenue rose by 46%, and corporate tax collections by 24.7%. In reforming their tax systems, Egypt have sought to eliminate various exemptions, broaden the tax base and modernize their tax systems. Businesses can file and pay taxes electronically. As a result, 2 million Egyptians filed taxes in 2005, double the number in 2004.  In paying Taxes 2010, the number of hours has reduced by 231 hours, reflecting the increased use of accounting software, and efforts made to increase familiarity with the 2005 tax legislation, while the TTR has reduced due to increases made to the social security bonds.

Education
Formal education in Egypt consists of four stages. Two years of pre-school education are not compulsory in the country but are encouraged.  Second is the basic education followed by secondary education, and lastly the tertiary level or post-secondary education.  The importance of entrepreneurship education (EPE) and training has been recognized in the educational sector and efforts have been ongoing to establish EPE in the country, however the formal education curriculum at basic and secondary levels does not contain official content related to EPE.  This was reflected in the 2008 Egypt's poor comparative standing relative to other GEM countries on the Assessment of Entrepreneurial Framework Conditions particularly in the presence of education and training system, Egypt ranked last place. Egypt has the second lowest rate for the percentage of the population (18-64) that has received any exposure to entrepreneurship in the education and training system. Only 7.5% of Egyptians reported ever having taken any courses on starting a business as part of school-based activity, or participating in related training after leaving the formal education system. Of the non-entrepreneurially-active population, adults who have never received start-up training were much less likely to perceive that they had the skills, knowledge, and experience to start a business than those who had.  80% of national experts agreed that the education system was one of the top three areas constraininge entrepreneurship in Egypt. The majority of experts did not believe that people in their countries generally possess the necessary know-how and experience to start-up and manage business,  Egypt ranked 21st, placing it in the bottom third of GEM countries.,. The results of study by Organisation for Economic Co-operation and Development (OECD) and EU showed similar results, Egypt showed significant progress in implementing policies in all 10 Charter dimensions with the exception of education and training for entrepreneurship (Dimension 2).

Ranking for the Arab Countries

Notes:
n/a - not ranked
Ease of Doing Business - ranked among 189 Economies
GCI Index - ranked among 139 Economies
Economic Freedom Score - 0 to 100, where 100 represents the maximum freedom
Prosperity Index -The Prosperity Index assessed 110 countries, accounting for over 90 percent of the world's population, and is based on 89 different variables, each of which has a demonstrated effect on economic growth or on personal wellbeing. The Index consists of eight sub-indexes, i.e. Economy, Entrepreneurship & Opportunity (E&O), Governance, Education, Health, Safety & Security, Personal Freedom and Social Capital.
The ICT value falls on a scale of 0-10 and is calculated from three key indicators: number of telephone lines per thousand of the population, number of computers per thousand of the population, and number of internet users per thousand of the population. The top 10 per cent of states score in the range 9–10, the next highest 10 per cent of states score in the range 8-9 and so on.
Innovation System Index - The index value falls on a scale of 0-10 and is calculated from three key indicators: Total royalty payments and receipts in US$ per person, number of patent applications granted by the US Patent and Trademark Office per million people, and the number of scientific and technical journal articles published per million people. The top 10 percent of states score in the range 9–10, the next highest 10 per cent of states score in the range 8-9 and so on.
HDI - Calculated based on data from UNDESA (2009d), Barro and Lee (2010), UNESCO Institute for Statistics (2010a), World Bank (2010g) and IMF (2010a).
Education and Human Resources Score - The index value falls on a scale of 0-10 and is calculated from three key indicators: adult literacy rate, secondary enrolment, and tertiary enrolment. The top 10 per cent of states score in the range 9–10, the next highest 10 per cent of states score in the range 8-9 and so on.
Press Freedom Index- The lower the value of a state's press freedom index, the better the situation for press freedom, ranked among 178 countries.

References

Economy of Egypt
Entrepreneurship